The Albert Community Centre (built in 1912) is a designated Municipal Heritage Property located in the Varsity View, neighborhood of Saskatoon, Saskatchewan, Canada.  Originally built as the Albert School, the -storey brick building served as a public school until 1978 when the building was sold to the city and became the Albert Community Centre.  The school was originally named for Prince Albert, Queen Victoria's Consort. The most noticeable feature of the building include limestone trim, crenellated tower, crossed mullioned windows, dormers and curved parapet gables.

References

Buildings and structures in Saskatoon
Buildings and structures completed in 1912
1912 establishments in Saskatchewan